Lieutenant Colonel Herbert Jones,  (14 May 1940 – 28 May 1982), known as H. Jones, was a British Army officer and posthumous recipient of the Victoria Cross (VC). He was awarded the VC after being killed in action during the Battle of Goose Green for his actions as commanding officer of the 2nd Battalion, Parachute Regiment, during the Falklands War.

Background

Jones was born in Putney, the eldest of three sons of Herbert Jones (1888–1957), an American artist, and his Welsh wife, Olwen Pritchard (1902–1990), a nurse. He attended St. Peter's Preparatory School in Seaford, Sussex, Eton College and DLD College London. He joined the British Army on leaving school and, on graduation from the Royal Military Academy Sandhurst, on 23 July 1960, was commissioned into the Devonshire and Dorset Regiment as a second lieutenant.

He was promoted to lieutenant on 23 January 1962, captain on 23 July 1966, and major on 31 December 1972, At this time he was brigade major at HQ 3rd Infantry Brigade in Northern Ireland. As such he was responsible for the efforts to find Captain Robert Nairac who had been abducted by the Provisional IRA. Nairac and Jones had become friends and would sometimes go to the Jones household for supper. After a four-day search, the Garda Síochána confirmed that Nairac had been shot and killed in the Republic of Ireland after being smuggled over the border. On 13 December 1977 he was appointed a Member of the Order of the British Empire (MBE) for his services in Northern Ireland that year. On 30 June 1979 he was promoted lieutenant colonel, and on 1 December 1979 he was transferred to the Parachute Regiment. In the 1981 New Year Honours he was appointed an Officer of the Order of the British Empire (OBE).

Falklands War

Jones was on holiday in France when he heard the news of the invasion of the Falklands. He had just returned from training in Kenya, and his battalion, 2nd Battalion The Parachute Regiment (2 PARA), was earmarked for deployment for Belize.

Jones' battalion was attached, alongside 3 PARA, to reinforce 3 Commando Brigade Royal Marines, the first major infantry formation to be sent south. During the Battle of Goose Green, an attack against entrenched Argentinian positions, with his unit pinned down by heavy fire from MAG machine guns and FAL automatic rifles, he led a charge against the nearest position. He was killed while doing so but the Argentinian unit surrendered shortly afterwards.  For his actions he was posthumously awarded the Victoria Cross.

Command of 2 PARA passed to Major Chris Keeble. Jones' body was buried in a battlefield grave at Ajax Bay on 30 May. After the war it was exhumed and re-buried at the Blue Beach War Cemetery in San Carlos on 25 October 1982.

Spencer Fitz-Gibbon, a former TA Para officer and military theorist, wrote in 1995 that, despite his undoubted courage, Jones did more to hinder than to help 2 Para, losing sight of the overall battle picture and failing to allow his sub-unit commanders to exercise mission command, before his fatal attempt to lead "A" Company forward from the position where they had become bogged down.

Margaret Thatcher said "his life was lost, but his death was the turning point in the battle." The battle demonstrated the UK's increasingly unquestionable military superiority, quelling concerns about possible defeat, and led to the release of 112 civilians who had been imprisoned in the local community hall for the best part of a month.

VC citation

His Victoria Cross is displayed at the National Army Museum in Chelsea, London.

Memorials
Jones' grave at Blue Beach War Cemetery is marked with a headstone engraved with the Parachute Regiment's insignia and that of the Victoria Cross. The headstone includes the quotation: "He is not the beginning but the continuing of the same unto the end." A street in Stanley was named H Jones Road in his memory in addition to Jones Avenue in Mount Pleasant air base. A memorial stone to all those killed at the scene of the battle, near Darwin, also bears his name. His name is also on the South Atlantic Task Force Memorial in St Paul's Cathedral, London, on the wall with the names of the fallen in the Falklands Memorial Chapel at Pangbourne College, and the Parachute Regiment Memorial at their headquarters in Aldershot; he also has a memorial in the cloisters of Eton College and a plaque on a footpath at Kingswear, Devon. The memorial board from St Peter's School, carved with the name of Jones, can be seen in Seaford Museum. In addition the 'Colonel H' Public house in Great Yarmouth, Norfolk, is named in his honour. There is a wooden plaque memorial in Kingswear parish church and a copy of the citation is on view near the memorial.

Family
Jones's widow, Sara, was appointed a Commander of the Order of the British Empire (CBE) for charity work (she is involved with a number of charities related to the armed forces), and since 2003 has been a Deputy Lieutenant of Wiltshire. Both of their sons, Rupert and David, served as infantry officers in the Devon and Dorsets (now merged into The Rifles). Rupert commanded the 1st Mechanised Brigade from 2012 to 2014, and was promoted to major general in 2016, making him, at 47, the youngest general officer in the British Army at the time.

Notes

References

Further reading
 H. Jones VC: The Life and Death of an Unusual Hero (John Wilsey, Hutchinson, London, 2002)
 2 Para's Battle for Darwin Hill and Goose Green by David J Kenney

External links
 VCs of the Falklands War (citation details)
 
  (in Spanish)

British military personnel killed in the Falklands War
British recipients of the Victoria Cross
Devonshire and Dorset Regiment officers
British Parachute Regiment officers
British Army personnel of the Falklands War
British military personnel of The Troubles (Northern Ireland)
Officers of the Order of the British Empire
People educated at Eton College
People from Putney
1940 births
1982 deaths
Graduates of the Royal Military Academy Sandhurst
English people of American descent
English people of Welsh descent
British Army recipients of the Victoria Cross
Military personnel from London